The 1899 Auburn Tigers football team represented Auburn University in the 1899 Southern Intercollegiate Athletic Association football season. The Tigers went 3–1–1, outscoring their opponents 148–11 and holding four opponents scoreless. This team was noteworthy as the last to be coached by Tigers head coach, John Heisman. It is also one of the first teams to employ a Hurry-up offense. As Heisman recalled: 
In Heisman's opinion, this was his best team while at Auburn.

The squad is also remembered as the only team to score in the legendary 1899 Sewanee team that went undefeated and beat Texas, Texas A&M, Tulane, LSU and Ole Miss over a 6-day span. Auburn lost their matchup to the "Iron Men" by a single point.

Schedule

References

Auburn
Auburn Tigers football seasons
Auburn Tigers football